Rubetsu (Japanese: 留別村, Rubetsu-mura, Russian: Рубэцу) is a village in Etorofu District, both of which are located in the disputed Northern Territories area of the Kuril Islands. It is currently administered by Russia as part of Yuzhno-Kurilsky District in Sakhalin Oblast, although Japan continues to claim it as part of Hokkaido Prefecture.

References 

Villages in Hokkaido
Rural localities in Sakhalin Oblast